Pulsus bigeminus is a cardiovascular phenomenon characterized by groups of two heartbeats close together followed by a longer pause. The second pulse is weaker than the first. Look for a pattern of what appears to be a relatively normal QRS complexes, each followed by a smaller, abnormal one. The smaller beat is palpated as either a missing or an extra beat, and on EKG resembles a PVC.  These PVCs appearing every other beat are also called extrasystoles.

This phenomenon can be a sign of hypertrophic obstructive cardiomyopathy or of many other types of heart disease (see list below). Other causes include digitalis toxicity, induction of anesthesia, placement of surgical instrumentation into the thorax or as a benign, temporary phenomenon.

In Pulsus Bigeminus not all of the conducted electrical activity will elicit sufficient ventricular contraction to produce a palpable pulse. This is important for two reasons. One, an ECG may give a ventricular contraction rate that does not correspond to the palpated pulse rate. Secondly, because not all beats are being conducted, patients may present with symptoms of low output heart failure, e.g. Dizziness, shortness of breath or hypotension, even with a normal ECG.

Cause
Causes Include:

 Electrolyte imbalance e.g. Hypo or hyperkalemia
 Hypothyroidism
 Betablocker therapy
 Digoxin
 Myocardial Infarction
 Destruction or degeneration of the cardiac conduction system or heart muscle cells
 Infection

A doctor can discriminate pulsus bigeminus from pulsus alternans by auscultating the heart.

Management

Management includes looking for and removing underlying cause, including medicines (such as a Calcium Channel blocker) and inotropic therapy to return cardiac output back to normal. If highly symptomatic over a longer period ablation therapy may be the only viable option.

See also
 Pulsus bisferiens
 Dicrotic pulse

References 

Cardiovascular diseases